Rajčany is a village and municipality in the Topoľčany District of the Nitra Region, Slovakia. It is unofficially a part of Topoľčany agglomeration. In 2011 the village had 550 inhabitants.

References

External links 
 Official homepage 
 http://en.e-obce.sk/obec/rajcany/rajcany.html

Villages and municipalities in Topoľčany District